| tries = {{#expr:
 + 5 + 5 + 10 + 7 + 10 + 6 + 5
 + 3 + 5 + 6 + 7 + 9 + 5 + 10
 + 4 + 3 + 8 + 6 + 7 + 8 + 6
 + 9 + 7 + 7 + 3 + 10 + 6 + 6
 + 5 + 6 + 10 + 4 + 2 + 4 + 2
 + 11 + 7 + 2 + 7 + 7 + 8 + 6
 + 6 + 6 + 5 + 6 + 5 + 5 + 9
 + 8 + 9 + 13 + 9 + 7 + 8 + 7
 + 7 + 5 + 7 + 10
 + 9 + 6
 + 5 + 9 + 10 + 9 + 11 + 14 + 6  
 + 11 + 5 + 6 + 3 + 6 + 9 + 6   
 + 1 + 6 + 5 + 5 + 5 + 1 
 + 8 + 3 + 10 + 3 + 8 + 3 + 8 
 + 7 + 2 + 10 + 7 + 3 + 7  
 + 7 + 5 + 6 + 8 
 + 5 + 7 + 4 + 4 + 6 + 6 + 4
 + 3 + 3 + 8 + 8 + 13 + 11
 + 5 + 6 + 8 + 7 + 2 + 7 + 8 
 + 5 + 10 + 6 + 7 + 7 + 10 + 3 
 + 5 + 5 + 7 + 9 
 + 8 + 7 + 4 + 4 + 5 + 13 + 6 
 + 3 + 0 + 9 + 4 + 5  
 + 10 + 7 + 7 + 6 + 10 + 7 + 9 
 + 7 + 3 + 11 + 7 + 3 + 7 + 6 
 + 4 + 6 + 3 + 9 + 8 + 11 + 9   
 + 9 + 6 + 11
 + 6 + 9 + 12 + 12 + 9 + 8 + 7 
 + 7 + 9 + 8 + 8 + 4 + 6 + 10
 + 11 + 7 + 6 + 10 + 11 + 7 + 9 
 + 7 + 10 + 10 + 11 + 7 + 7 + 13 
 + 3 + 1 + 10 + 11 + 9 + 13 + 6
 + 4 + 12 + 12 + 7 + 8 + 11 + 10
 + 11
}}
| top point scorer = 248 – Benjamin Jones (Caldy) 
| top try scorer   = 28 – Nathan Taylor (Cinderford)
| prevseason       = 2019–20
| nextseason       = 2022–23
}}

2021–22 National League 1 is the twelfth season (34th overall) of the third tier of the English domestic rugby union competitions, since the professionalised format of the second division was introduced.

Caldy were crowned champions on 23 April 2022, following their final match of the season at home to runner-up Sale, beating them 13–9 in front of a club record attendance of 3,023. Next season they will be playing in the RFU Championship. Blackheath (14th position) and Tonbridge Juddians (15th) are relegated to National 2 East.

Structure
The league initially consisted of sixteen teams, with all the teams playing each other on a home and away basis, to make a total of thirty matches each. Due to financial difficulties, Old Elthamians withdrew before the season started, reducing the league to fifteen teams. There is one promotion place, with the champions promoted to the RFU Championship. As the Championship consisted of just eleven teams this season, a second promotion place would have become available if the winner of the Championship, Ealing Trailfinders were promoted to Premiership Rugby. However this will not be the case as they were ineligible for promotion. There are usually three relegation places with the bottom three teams relegated to either National League 2 North or National League 2 South depending on the geographical location of the team. Due to Old Elthamians withdrawal, before the season started, there are only two relegation places.

The results of the matches contribute points to the league table as follows:
 4 points are awarded for a win
 2 points are awarded for a draw
 0 points are awarded for a loss, however
 1 losing (bonus) point is awarded to a team that loses a match by 7 points or fewer
 1 additional (bonus) point is awarded to a team scoring 4 tries or more in a match.

Participating teams and locations

League table

Fixtures & results
Fixtures for the season were announced by the RFU on 4 May 2021.

Round 1

Round 2

Round 3

Round 4

Round 5

Round 6

Round 7

Round 8

Round 9

Round 9 (rescheduled matches)

Round 10

Round 11

Round 12

Round 13

Round 14

Round 15

Round 16

Round 17

Round 18

Round 19

Rounds 12, 14, 15 & 17 (rescheduled matches)

Round 20

Round 21

Round 22

Round 23

Round 24

Round 15 & 21 (rescheduled matches)

Round 25

Round 26

Round 27

Round 28

Round 29

Round 30

Rescheduled match

See also
 2021–22 National League 2 North
 2021–22 National League 2 South

Notes

References

External links
 NCA Rugby

3
National League 1 seasons